Franco Ferreiro and André Sá were the defending champions but decided not to participate.
Marin Draganja and Dino Marcan won the title, defeating Blaž Kavčič and Antonio Veić 6–2, 6–0 in the final.

Seeds

Draw

Draw

References
 Main Draw

Aberto Santa Catarina de Tenis - Doubles
2012 Doubles